Kosala Ravindu (born 2 July 2000) is a Sri Lankan cricketer. He made his Twenty20 debut on 4 January 2020, for Badureliya Sports Club in the 2019–20 SLC Twenty20 Tournament. He made his first-class debut for Badureliya Sports Club in the 2019–20 Premier League Tournament on 22 August 2020. He made his List A debut on 26 March 2021, for Panadura Sports Club in the 2020–21 Major Clubs Limited Over Tournament.

References

External links
 

2000 births
Living people
Sri Lankan cricketers
Badureliya Sports Club cricketers
Panadura Sports Club cricketers
Place of birth missing (living people)